Hassel is a German, Danish, Norwegian and Swedish surname. Notable people with this surname include the following:

Bryan Hassel, American popular writer on education
Danny Hassel (born 1967), American actor
Georg Hassel (1770–1829), German geographer
Kai-Uwe von Hassel (1913–1997), German politician from Schleswig-Holstein associated with the CDU party
Karl-Heinz von Hassel (1939–2016), German actor
Kaspar Hassel (1877–1962), Norwegian sailor
Odd Hassel (1897–1981), Norwegian physical chemist and Nobel Laureate
Sverre Hassel (1876–1928), Norwegian polar explorer
Tina Hassel (born 1964), German journalist

German-language surnames
Norwegian-language surnames
Swedish-language surnames